The 2022–23 season is Manchester City Women's Football Club's 35th season of competitive football and their 10th season in the Women's Super League, the highest level of English women's football.

Pre-season

Competitions

Women's Super League

Results summary

Results by matchday

Results

League table

FA Cup

As a member of the first tier, Manchester City entered the FA Cup in the fourth round proper.

League Cup

As a result of being eliminated from the UEFA Champions League at the qualifying stage, Manchester City entered the League Cup at the group stage. Entering after the draw was made, they were placed in the only remaining Northern region group with four teams.

Group stage

Knockout stage

Champions League

As a result of finishing third in the 2021–22 FA Women's Super League, Manchester City entered the Champions League in the first qualifying round.

First qualifying round

Squad information

Playing statistics

Starting appearances are listed first, followed by substitute appearances after the + symbol where applicable.

|-
|colspan="14"|Players away from the club on loan:

|-
|colspan="14"|Players who appeared for the club but left during the season:

|}

Transfers and loans

Transfers in

Transfers out

Loans out

References

Manchester City
2022